The Syracuse Stallions are a professional basketball team in Syracuse, New York, and members of The Basketball League (TBL).

History
The Syracuse Stallions were founded in 2017 by Mike Sugamosto and Josh Winans. The team joined the semiprofessional American Basketball Association for the 2018 season. The team had two successful seasons, including championship wins. and decided to become a professional basketball team.

On May 1, 2020, Evelyn Magley, CEO of The Basketball League (TBL), announced the Stallions were approved to join the league for the 2021 season.

On August 25, 2021, Nick Peroli, the Stallions head coach announced he would step down from that position and transition to an ownership role of the team.  
 On September 1, 2021, the Syracuse Stallions named Patrick Beilein the new head coach of the team.

Current roster

-->

References

Sports in Syracuse, New York
Basketball teams in New York (state)
The Basketball League teams
2018 establishments in New York (state)
Basketball teams established in 2017